Allal Saoudi (born 1932) is a Moroccan long-distance runner. He competed in the marathon at the 1960 Summer Olympics.

References

1932 births
Living people
Athletes (track and field) at the 1960 Summer Olympics
Moroccan male long-distance runners
Moroccan male marathon runners
Olympic athletes of Morocco
People from Meknes